Jean-François-Auguste Le Dentu (21 June 1841, in Basse-Terre (Guadeloupe) – 26 October 1926, in Paris) was a French surgeon.

Biography
Beginning in 1863 he was an interne of medicine in Paris, later serving as an aide of anatomy (1864) and as a prosector to the medical faculty (1867). In 1867 he received his doctorate with a thesis on venous circulation of the foot and leg, two years later obtaining his agrégation in surgery with the dissertation Des anomalies du testicule (testicular anomalies).

In 1872 he became a surgeon to the "Bureau central", followed by a promotion as chirurgien des hôpitaux in 1876. Subsequently, he was appointed professor to the medical faculty in Paris; second chair of clinical surgery at Hôpital Necker (1890-1904), followed by an assignment as chair of clinical surgery at the Hôtel-Dieu (1904-1908). 

Le Dentu is remembered for contributions made in the field of urosurgery; in 1875 being credited with achieving the first recorded occurrence of cure by nephrectomy in France, and in 1898, with Joaquín Albarrán (1860-1912), performing the first nephroureterectomy for upper tract urothelial cancer.

Written works 
He was the author of numerous articles in the fields of surgery and urology. With Pierre Delbet (1861-1957) and others, he published the multi-volume Traité de chirurgie clinique et opératoire (1901 et seq.). He made significant contributions to Sigismond Jaccoud's Nouveau dictionnaire de medecine et de chirurgie. Other publications by Le Dentu include:
 Traité des maladies des voies urinaires, 1868-1881 - Diseases of the urinary tract.
 Contribution à l'histoire de l'extraction des calculs du rein, 1882 - Contribution to the history of kidney stone extraction.
 Néphrectomie, 1885 - Nephrectomy.
 Affections chirurgicales des reins, des uretères et des capsules surrénales, 1889 - Surgical disorders of the kidneys, ureter and adrenals.
 Du Traitement des affections inflammatoires des annexes de l'utérus, 1892 - Treatment of inflammatory diseases of the uterine adnexa.

References

External links
 

1926 deaths
1841 births
People from Basse-Terre
French surgeons
French urologists